Poza prawem (Polish for behind the law) is an album released by Polish punk rock band The Analogs.

Track listing
Titles in parentheses are translated from Polish.
 "Pieśń aniołów" (The Angels' Song)
 "Poza prawem" (Above The Law)
 "Dźwięk rebelii" (Sound of Rebellion)
 "39-45"
 "Lato 95" (Summer of '95)
 "Odbij się od dna" (Back From the Bottom)
 "Zjednoczeni" (United)
 "P.S.M"       ( R.Y.M.W )
 "Ten kraj" (This Country)
 "Zawsze najgorsi" (Always The Worst)
 "Prawo do pracy" (A Right to Work - Chelsea cover)
 "Uliczni wojownicy" (Street Warriors)
 "Władza albo śmierć" (Power or Death)
 "Blizny alkohol i tatuaże" (Scars, Alcohol, and Tattoos)

Personnel
Paweł Czekała - bass guitar
Kacper Kosiński - drums
Piotr Półtorak - guitar
Jakub Krawczyk - guitar
Dominik Pyrzyna - vocals
Additionally, on "Pieśń Aniołów"
Marta "Wiśnia" Wiśniewska - backing vocals

External links
  The Analogs official website
  Jimmy Jazz Records

2006 albums
The Analogs albums
Jimmy Jazz Records albums